Darzikola-ye Akhundi-ye Bala (also Romanized as Darzīkolā-ye Ākhūndī-ye Bālā; also known as Darzīkolā-ye Ākhūndī) is a village in Gatab-e Shomali Rural District, Gatab District, Babol County, Mazandaran Province, Iran. At the 2006 census, its population was 1,713, in 444 families.

References 

Populated places in Babol County